El Romaní is a small village under the local government of the municipality of Sollana, Ribera Baixa, Spain, with a total population of 286.

References

Populated places in the Province of Valencia